Bai Xuoqian is a Kokang politician from Shan State, Myanmar.

Career 
In 1992, Bai assisted Pheung Kya-shin in ousting Yang Mao-liang from the leadership of the Myanmar Nationalities Democratic Alliance Army (MNDAA), but later tried to replace Pheung himself with the support of Myanmar's government. Bai allied himself with the Tatmadaw (Myanmar Armed Forces) to oust Pheung during the three-day Kokang incident in 2009. Remnants of the MNDAA were reorganized into Border Guard Force #1006 under Bai's supervision afterwards.

Bai was elected as an MP of the Amyotha Hluttaw representing Laukkai Constituency No. 2. during the 2010 general election, and became the first head of the Kokang Self-Administered Zone. Under his rule, the region became known for drugs and weapons trafficking. Bai was not very popular and survived an assassination attempt in March 2012.

Bai's deputy, Liu Gaoxi, was elected in the same general election in 2010, and was known for his involvement with drugs trafficking.

See also 
 Lo Hsing Han

References 

Kokang
Burmese rebels
Year of birth missing (living people)
Living people
Burmese people of Chinese descent
Members of the House of Nationalities
Burmese drug traffickers